Kolannalu or kolkolannalu (also named kolattam), 'stick dance', is one of the most popular dance narratives in the Southern part of India. 

It is a rural art usually performed during village festivals. It is a combination of rhythmic movements, songs and music. The Kolattam group comprises dancers ranging from 8 to 40 who are grouped in pairs. The sticks provides the main rhythm. 

The dancers are led by a leader and move about in two circles. The inner circle receive the strikes on their sticks from the artists in the outer circle that deliver them. Kolattam is also called Kolanna in the Prakasam district of Andhra Pradesh.

Dances of India
Culture of Andhra Pradesh

Related Kummi folk dance of Andhra pradesh and Kerela